Frogwares is a Ukrainian video game development studio headquartered in Kyiv with subsidiary offices in Dublin, Ireland. The studio and its subsidiaries develop adventure games for PlayStation 4, Xbox One, Microsoft Windows, Nintendo Switch as well as PlayStation 3, Xbox 360, Nintendo DS, Nintendo 3DS, Wii, and mobile.

Frogwares created the Adventures of Sherlock Holmes series, which sold around seven million copies worldwide.

The studio released its first open world investigation video game, The Sinking City, inspired by the works of H. P. Lovecraft, in 2019.

History 
Frogwares was founded in 2000 in Ukraine and Ireland by French expatriates. Waël Amr is the CEO. The name "Frogwares" comes from the derogatory term "froggies" to designate people of French origin.

When it was created, the studio was made up of a team of six people which then expanded to reach eighty employees in 2018. The studio specialized in the Sherlock Holmes adventure games series.

With Sherlock Holmes: The Mystery of the Persian Carpet (2008), Frogwares began to develop casual games. The studio created in 2011 a dedicated subsidiary, Waterlily Games. The casual games produced by the studio are often distributed exclusively for download, with the exception of the "Sherlock Holmes" casual games, which are also published on physical media.

In 2010, Frogwares released World of Battles, its first multiplayer MMORTS. World of Battles is a strategy game that takes place in a fantastic medieval universe where the player trains and controls an army and must succeed in defeating other armies controlled by other players to recover gems.

In 2013, Frogwares opened a second subsidiary, 3AM Studios, to release Magrunner: Dark Pulse (2013), a strategic sci-fi shooter based on the magnetization of cubes and platforms to move through each level. The game is considered a Portal-like.

In 2014, Focus Home Interactive announced a Call of Cthulhu game developed with Frogwares, however both later separated.

On 24 February 2022, Frogwares posted on social media about the Russian invasion of Ukraine and how it has affected the development team. They have published a series of similar messages since.

Games developed

Casual adventure games 
Casual games are developed under the name Waterlily Games. This sub-studio is focused on casual, hidden object, and light adventure games for PC and iOS.
The Adventures of Sherlock Holmes: The Mystery of the Persian Carpet (2008)
Mata Hari and the Kaiser's Submarines (2008)
Department 42: The Mystery of the Nine (2009)
Sherlock Holmes and the Mystery of Osborne House (2011)
Secret Mission: The Forgotten Island (2011)
Sherlock Holmes and the Hound of the Baskervilles (2011)
Dracula: Love Kills (2011)
Journey: The Heart of Gaia (2012)
Sherlock Holmes and the Mystery of the Frozen City (2013) for Nintendo 3DS

Litigations 

The studio has encountered several disputes with its business partners. In 2002, the distribution of the game Sherlock Holmes: The Mystery of the Mummy was made by intermediaries who did not pay the studio honestly: Frogwares filed several lawsuits against them.

The studio then chose Focus Home Interactive as a licensee from 2004–2005 to 2014–2015.

In 2019, Frogwares claimed Focus Home Interactive was not the publisher of the games, but a distribution intermediary that did not participate in the financing of games. The relationship between the two companies ended in a dispute in the fall of 2019 when Focus Home Interactive's license ended. The situation has resulted in the temporary withdrawal of most Frogwares games from these platforms. The development studio, who remains the sole owner of the rights, had to initiate new certifications and online publishing processes for each of its games so that they are available again on the websites concerned. The games thus reappeared gradually at the start of 2020.

In a blogpost from August 2020, Frogwares alleged that  Bigben Interactive (now Nacon) used their The Sinking City IP inappropriately and therefore terminated their contract with Bigben Interactive and withdrew the game from download platforms. In January 2021, the game was restored to stores by court order as the contract was terminated in a 'manifestly unlawful' manner. Frogwares had urged users not to purchase certain versions of The Sinking City, such as the version that was returned to Steam, stating these versions were not created by them.

See also 
Legend Entertainment
Pendulo Studios
Revolution Software

References

External links 

Companies based in Kyiv
Privately held companies of Ukraine
Ukrainian companies established in 2000
Video game companies established in 2000
Video game companies of Ukraine
Video game development companies